The 1992 NCAA Division I women's basketball tournament began on March 18 and ended on April 5. The tournament featured 48 teams. The Final Four consisted of Virginia, Stanford, Southwest Missouri State (now known as Missouri State), and Western Kentucky, with Stanford defeating Western Kentucky 78–62 to win its second NCAA title. Stanford's Molly Goodenbour was named the Most Outstanding Player of the tournament.

Notable events

Missouri State (then Southwest Missouri State), was not a regular participant in the Tournament. They had not earned a bid until 1991, when they won their first game and lost their second game. In 1992, they were assigned an eight seed. Their first game was against Kansas, which they won 75–59. That win matched them up against the number one seed in the Midwest region, Iowa. The Hawkeyes were 25–3, winner of the Big Ten conference in their ninth year under Hall of Fame coach C. Vivian Stringer. Despite the odds, the Missouri State team took Iowa to overtime, and won 61–60 in the overtime period. That matched up the Bears against fifth-seeded UCLA, but Missouri State won easily, 83–57. Their next game was against SEC regular season champion Ole Miss, one of a small number of teams who had played in every NCAA tournament since the first one in 1982. Ole Miss was the number two seed in the region, but Missouri State again achieved an upset, winning the game 94–71. That win placed Missouri State in the Final Four. Prior to this win, the lowest seed to make it to the Final Four was a four seed. Only one team, Arkansas in 1998, with a nine seed, has made it to the Final four with a weaker seed.

Missouri State's opponent in the semi-final game was Western Kentucky, who has also achieved some upsets. After beating Alabama, the Hilltoppers faced Tennessee, the number one seed in the Mideast region, and the defending national champions. Western Kentucky won the game 75–70, and went on to beat the number 2 seed in the region, Maryland, by the identical score.

The other semi-final included two of the powerhouses of the sport at the time. Both Virginia and Stanford were number one seeds. Stanford had won the National championship two years before, while Virginia was competing in their third consecutive final four, and were the runner-up in the prior year's tournament.

In the game between Western Kentucky and Missouri State, the Hilltoppers dashed the upset hopes of the Missouri State Bears, and won the game 84–72. The game between Stanford and Virginia was much closer, with Virginia leading late but Stanford pulled to a small lead. Virginia's Dawn Staley scored to cut the lead to one with eleven seconds left. Stanford now controlled the ball, and in bounded it, but with time running out, the ball was loose on the floor. Staley dived after the loose ball, recovered it and flung it to teammate Melanee Wagener while Staley called for a timeout. The referee did not hear her call for the timeout, then heard the horn announcing the end of the game, so the refs and the teams headed off the court. Staley chased after Doug Cloud, the referee, insisting she had called a time out. A different referee, Bob Trammell, had heard her call for the timeout, so the teams were called back, and a fraction of a second were placed back on the clock. Virginia in bounded the ball and got it to Staley, but she was unable to get a final shot off. Stanford coach Tara VanDerveer would call it, "the longest seven-tenths of a second in my life". The Cardinal won a one-point game 66–65. Van Derveer would later recount the story when preparing to train the USA National team, including Staley, for the 1996 Olympics.

After losing three starters from the prior year's team, including All-American Sonia Henning, some observers, including assistant coach Amy Tucker, were not expecting a stellar season. Their point guard, Molly Goodenbour, had not seen a lot of playing time in prior years playing behind Henning and Jennifer Azzi, but she would go on to hit 18 three-pointers in the tournament, at the time an NCAA record, and win the MVP award for the tournament.  Teammates Rachel Hemmer and Val Whiting also earned spots on the All-Tournament team as the team won a 78–62 victory over Western Kentucky to claim their second national championship in three years.

Records
 Free throws – Tonya Baucom (Missouri State) hit nine of nine free throws attempts, tied with several others for free throw accuracy at 100%, and second only behind Sheryl Swoopes for free throws made in a Final Four without a miss. This occurred in the National Semi-final against Western Kentucky.

Qualifying teams – automatic
Forty-eight teams were selected to participate in the 1992 NCAA Tournament. Twenty-two conferences were eligible for an automatic bid to the 1992 NCAA tournament.

Qualifying teams – at-large
Twenty-six additional teams were selected to complete the forty-eight invitations.

Bids by conference
Twenty-two conferences earned an automatic bid.  In eleven cases, the automatic bid was the only representative from the conference. Three conferences, the Great Midwest, the Midwestern Collegiate, and the North Atlantic conferences sent a single representative as an at-large team. One independent school was selected.  Twenty-five additional at-large teams were selected from ten of the conferences.

First and second rounds

In 1992, the field remained at 48 teams. The teams were seeded, and assigned to four geographic regions, with seeds 1–12 in each region. In Round 1, seeds 8 and 9 faced each other for the opportunity to face the 1 seed in the second round, seeds 7 and 10 played for the opportunity to face the 2 seed, seeds 5 and 12 played for the opportunity to face the 4 seed, and seeds 6 and 11 played for the opportunity to face the 3 seed. In the first two rounds, the higher seed was given the opportunity to host the first-round game. In most cases, the higher seed accepted the opportunity. The exceptions:

 Sixth seeded Arizona State played eleventh seeded DePaul at DePaul
 Ninth seeded UC Santa Barbara played eighth seeded Houston at UC Santa Barbara

The following table lists the region, host school, venue and the thirty-two first and second round locations:

Regionals and Final Four

The regionals, named for the general location, were held from March 26 to March 28 at these sites:

 East Regional University Hall, Charlottesville, Virginia (Host: University of Virginia)
 Mideast Regional Mackey Arena, West Lafayette, Indiana (Host: Purdue University)
 Midwest Regional CU Events Center (Coors Events Center), Boulder, Colorado (Host: University of Colorado at Boulder)
 West Regional Hec Edmundson Pavilion, Seattle (Host: University of Washington)

Each regional winner advanced to the Final Four, held April 4 and April 5 in Los Angeles at the Los Angeles Memorial Sports Arena (co-hosts: University of Southern California, University of California, Los Angeles)

Bids by state

The forty-eight teams came from twenty-nine states, plus Washington, D.C. California had the most teams with seven bids, the first time in tournament history a state had more than four bids. Twenty-one states did not have any teams receiving bids.

Brackets
First and second-round games played at higher seed except where noted.

East regional – Charlottesville, VA

West regional – Seattle, WA

Midwest regional – Boulder, CO

Mideast regional – West Lafayette, IN

Final Four – Los Angeles, CA

Record by conference
Fifteen conferences had more than one bid, or at least one win in NCAA Tournament play:

Seven conferences went 0-1: Colonial, Metro, MAAC, Midwestern Collegiate, North Atlantic Conference, Ohio Valley Conference, and Southern Conference.

All-Tournament team

 Molly Goodenbour, Stanford,
 Rachel Hemmer, Stanford,
 Val Whiting, Stanford
 Kim Pehlke, Western Kentucky
 Dawn Staley, Virginia

Game officials

 Art Bomengen (semifinal)
 Douglas Cloud (semifinal)
 Dee Kantner (semifinal)
 Bob Trammell (semifinal)
 Patty Broderick (final)
 Bill Stokes (final)

See also
1992 NCAA Division I men's basketball tournament
1992 NCAA Division II women's basketball tournament
1992 NCAA Division III women's basketball tournament
1992 NAIA Division I women's basketball tournament
1992 NAIA Division II women's basketball tournament

References

Tournament
NCAA Division I women's basketball tournament
NCAA Division I women's basketball tournament
NCAA Division I women's basketball tournament
Basketball competitions in Austin, Texas
Basketball competitions in Lubbock, Texas
Basketball competitions in Los Angeles